Exodus Glacier is a steep, smooth glacier  northeast of Mount Ellis, flowing from the northern edge of Midnight Plateau to the southwest side of Island Arena, in the Darwin Mountains of Antarctica. It was named by the Victoria University of Wellington Antarctic Expedition, 1962–63, in association with nearby Exodus Valley.

References 

Glaciers of Oates Land